Arthur Abele (born 30 July 1986 in Mutlangen, Baden-Württemberg) is a German decathlete who is the reigning European champion, winning the gold medal at the 2018 European Championships. He competed at the 2008 and 2016 Summer Olympics. Arthur Abele won gold in the Men's decathlon in the European Championships on August 8, 2018 in Berlin, Germany.

Achievements

References

External links 

 
 
 
 
 
 

1986 births
Living people
People from Mutlangen
Sportspeople from Stuttgart (region)
German decathletes
Olympic decathletes
Olympic athletes of Germany
Athletes (track and field) at the 2008 Summer Olympics
Athletes (track and field) at the 2016 Summer Olympics
European Athletics Championships winners
German national athletics champions
World Athletics Championships athletes for Germany